The Ereklasse is the highest tier of the national rugby union competition in the Netherlands.

Season 2017/2018

 Amstelveense RC (Amstelveen)
 A.S.R.V. Ascrum (Amsterdam)
 RC The Bassets (Sassenheim)
 Castricumse RC (Castricum)
 LRC DIOK (Leiden)
 DSR-C (Delft)
 RC The Dukes ('s-Hertogenbosch)
 RC Eemland (Amersfoort)
 RC 't Gooi (Naarden)
 Haagsche RC (The Hague)
 RC The Hookers (Hook of Holland)
 RC Hilversum (Hilversum)
 Oemoemenoe (Middelburg)
 Oisterwijk Oysters (Oisterwijk)
 Utrechtse RC (Utrecht)
 RC Waterland (Purmerend)

Champions
 2021-2022 LRC DIOK
 2018-2019 LRC DIOK
 2017-2018 RC 't Gooi
 2016-2017 RC Hilversum
 2015-2016 RC Hilversum
 2014-2015 RC Hilversum
 2013-2014 Haagsche RC
 2012-2013 RC 't Gooi
 2011-2012 RC Hilversum
 2010-2011 RC Hilversum
 2009-2010 RC Hilversum
 2008-2009 RC 't Gooi
 2007-2008 RC The Dukes
 2006-2007 Castricumse RC
 2005-2006 Castricumse RC
 2004-2005 Castricumse RC
 2003-2004 Castricumse RC
 2002-2003 Castricumse RC
 2001-2002 Haagsche RC
 2000-2001 Haagsche RC
 1999-2000 Castricumse RC
 1998-1999 Haagsche RC
 1997-1998 LRC DIOK
 1996-1997 LRC DIOK
 1995-1996 LRC DIOK
 1994-1995 LRC DIOK
 1993-1994 LRC DIOK
 1992-1993 LRC DIOK
 1991-1992 LRC DIOK
 1990-1991 LRC DIOK
 1989-1990 LRC DIOK
 1988-1989 LRC DIOK
 1987-1988 Castricumse RC
 1986-1987 Castricumse RC
 1985-1986 RC Hilversum
 1984-1985 Haagsche RC
 1983-1984 RC Hilversum
 1982-1983 RC Hilversum
 1981-1982 RC Hilversum
 1980-1981 LRC DIOK
 1979-1980 Haagsche RC
 1978-1979 none because of the weather conditions on 16-03-1979
 1977-1978 Haagsche RC
 1976-1977 Amsterdamse AC
 1975-1976 RC Hilversum
 1974-1975 RC Hilversum
 1973-1974 RC Hilversum
 1972-1973 Haagsche RC
 1971-1972 Haagsche RC
 1970-1971 Haagsche RC
 1969-1970 Haagsche RC
 1968-1969 Amsterdamse AC
 1967-1968 Haagsche RC
 1966-1967 Haagsche RC
 1965-1966 Haagsche RC
 1964-1965 RC Hilversum
 1963-1964 Amsterdamse AC
 1962-1963 Te Werve RFC
 1961-1962 RC Hilversum
 1960-1961 Amsterdamse AC
 1959-1960 RC Hilversum
 1958-1959 RC Hilversum
 1957-1958 RC Hilversum
 1956-1957 RC Hilversum
 1955-1956 Amsterdamse AC
 1954-1955 Amsterdamse AC
 1953-1954 Amsterdamse AC
 1952-1953 DSR-C
 1951-1952 RC 't Gooi
 1950-1951 DSR-C
 1949-1950 DSR-C
 1948-1949 Amsterdamse AC
 1947-1948 DSR-C
 1946-1947 Rotterdamse RC
 1945-1946 Amsterdamse AC
 1944-1945 Amsterdamse AC
 1943-1944 none
 1942-1943 none
 1941-1942 none
 1940-1941 none
 1939-1940 Amsterdamse AC
 1938-1939 DSR-C
 1937-1938 DSR-C
 1936-1937 ARVC
 1935-1936 ARVC

See also
Rugby union in the Netherlands

Rugby union in the Netherlands
National rugby union premier leagues
Netherlands
rugby union
Professional sports leagues in the Netherlands